Kluiverth Miguel Aguilar Díaz (born 5 May 2003) is a Peruvian professional footballer who plays as a defender for Belgian club Lommel, on loan from English club Manchester City.

Club career
He was included in The Guardian's "Next Generation 2020". On 19 April 2020, it was confirmed that Aguilar would join Manchester City for a fee of £1.5 million when he turns 18, in 2021.

Career statistics

References

2003 births
Living people
Footballers from Lima
Peruvian footballers
Peru youth international footballers
Association football defenders
Sporting Cristal footballers
Club Alianza Lima footballers
Manchester City F.C. players
Lommel S.K. players
Peruvian Primera División players
Challenger Pro League players
Peruvian expatriate footballers
Peruvian expatriate sportspeople in England
Expatriate footballers in England
Peruvian expatriate sportspeople in Belgium
Expatriate footballers in Belgium